The 1961 NBA playoffs was the postseason tournament of the National Basketball Association's 1960-61 season. The tournament concluded with the Eastern Division champion Boston Celtics defeating the Western Division champion St. Louis Hawks 4 games to 1 in the NBA Finals.

The Lakers made the playoffs for the first time after moving to Los Angeles. They were one game away from their first Finals in L.A. as the St. Louis Hawks defeat them.

The Division Semifinals were extended from a best-of-three to a best-of-five series.

For the Celtics, it was their third straight NBA title and fourth overall. This would be the last Finals appearance for the Hawks franchise to date; though they still exist in the NBA as the Atlanta Hawks, they have yet to return to the Finals as of 2020.

Bracket

Division Semifinals

Eastern Division Semifinals

(2) Philadelphia Warriors vs. (3) Syracuse Nationals

This was the eighth playoff meeting between these two teams, with the 76ers/Nationals winning four of the first seven meetings.

Western Division Semifinals

(2) Los Angeles Lakers vs. (3) Detroit Pistons

This was the eighth playoff meeting between these two teams, with the Lakers winning six of the first seven meetings when the Lakers were in Minneapolis.

Division Finals

Eastern Division Finals

(1) Boston Celtics vs. (3) Syracuse Nationals

This was the eighth playoff meeting between these two teams, with the Nationals winning four of the first seven meetings.

Western Division Finals

(1) St. Louis Hawks vs. (2) Los Angeles Lakers

This was the fifth playoff meeting between these two teams, with the Hawks winning three of the first four meetings while the Lakers were based in Minneapolis.

NBA Finals: (E1) Boston Celtics vs. (W1) St. Louis Hawks

 Bill Sharman's final NBA game.

This was the fourth playoff meeting between these two teams, with the Celtics winning two of the first three meetings.

References

External links
Basketball-Reference.com's 1961 NBA Playoffs page

National Basketball Association playoffs
Playoffs